The 1922–23 Army Cadets men's ice hockey season was the 20th season of play for the program. The team was coached by Talbot Hunter in his 3rd season.

Season
Prior to the first game, Army was allowed to practice on the Hobey Baker Memorial Rink by Princeton. Since the Stuart Rink was not yet ready, this was critical to the progress of Army's team. While Kevin O'Shea was the only returning starter, the team coalesced swiftly around the forward combinations between O'Shea, Stevenson, Marinelli and Caywood. After New Years, consistent weather allowed army to play its full schedule of 14 games. Unfortunately, the cold temperatures, combined with the lack of seating at Stuart Rink, also restricted the size of the crowd at each of their games.  With Baird providing capable goaltending, Army got off to a hot start, winning its first three games of the year. As their opposition become stronger, the Cadets began losing matches and they swiftly dropped down to a .500 record.

In early February, the defense put up a stout defense and Army was able to blank Dartmouth, defeating one of the best teams in the country. Army could not, however, sustain that effort and lost three of their last four games. While the cadets did break even with their record, the team's offense was limited to 1 goal or fewer in half of its games and would need to be better if Army was going to compete with the elite teams.

John Binns served as team manager with Charles Mason and Francis Graling as his assistants.

Roster

Standings

Schedule and results

|-
!colspan=12 style=";" | Regular Season

† Lafayette was an unofficial club team.

References

Army Black Knights men's ice hockey seasons
Army
Army
Army
Army